Andrea Nuti (born 8 April 1967 in Milan) is a retired Italian sprinter who specialized in the 400 metres.

Biography
He won six medals at the International athletics competitions, five of these with national relays team. He participated at two editions of the Summer Olympics (1992 and 1996), he has 37 caps in national team from 1990 to 2000.

His personal best time is 45.35 seconds, achieved in July 1993 in Sestriere. Once finished his athletic career he has started working (2002) as physical trainer at Inter FC in the juvenile teams. In 2010 he was part of the technical staff of Mourinho's team and with Inter he won the Champions League in Madrid, on 22 May 2011.

International competitions

1Disqualified in the quarterfinals

National titles
He has won 9 times the individual national championship.
5 wins in the 400 metres (1990, 1991, 1993, 1995, 1996)
4 wins in the 400 metres indoor (1990, 1991, 1992, 1994)

See also
 Italian all-time lists - 400 metres
 Italy national relay team

References

External links
 

1967 births
Living people
Italian male sprinters
Athletes (track and field) at the 1992 Summer Olympics
Athletes (track and field) at the 1996 Summer Olympics
Olympic athletes of Italy
Athletes from Milan
World Athletics Championships athletes for Italy
Mediterranean Games gold medalists for Italy
Athletes (track and field) at the 1991 Mediterranean Games
Mediterranean Games medalists in athletics
World Athletics Indoor Championships medalists
Italian Athletics Championships winners
20th-century Italian people